Leptogamasus is a genus of mites in the family Parasitidae.

Species
 Leptogamasus doinae Juvara-Bals, 1981     
 Leptogamasus margaretae Juvara-Bals, 1981     
 Leptogamasus motrensis Juvara-Bals, 1981     
 Leptogamasus oblitterus Witalinski, 1978     
 Leptogamasus orghidani Juvara-Bals, 1981     
 Leptogamasus paracarpaticus Juvara-Bals, 1981     
 Leptogamasus parvulus (Berlese, 1903)     
 Leptogamasus semisicatus (Athias, 1967)     
 Leptogamasus septimellus Athias     
 Leptogamasus serruliger (Athias, 1967)     
 Leptogamasus stipulodimissus Athias-Henriot, 1979     
 Leptogamasus succineus (Witalinski, 1973)     
 Leptogamasus suecicus Trägårdh, 1936     
 Leptogamasus tintinellus (Athias, 1967)     
 Leptogamasus variabilis Juvara-Bals, 1981

References

Parasitidae